Benjamin James Frazer (born 2 April 1981) is an English cricketer.  Frazer is a right-handed batsman who bowls right-arm off break.  He was born in Truro, Cornwall.

Frazer made his debut for Hertfordshire in the 2000 MCCA Knockout Trophy against the Essex Cricket Board.  He played Minor counties cricket for Hertfordshire from 2000 to 2019, including 62 Minor Counties Championship matches and 68 MCCA Knockout Trophy matches.  In 2001, he made his List A debut against the Durham Cricket Board in the Cheltenham & Gloucester Trophy.  He made 4 further List A appearances for the county, the last coming against Ireland in the 1st round of the 2004 Cheltenham & Gloucester Trophy, which was held in 2003.  In his 5 List A matches, he scored 74 runs at a batting average of 14.80, with a high score of 24.  With the ball, he took 7 wickets at a bowling average of 30.71, with best figures of 3/56.

He played for the Middlesex Second XI in 2001.

References

External links
Ben Frazer at ESPNcricinfo
Ben Frazer at CricketArchive

1981 births
Living people
Sportspeople from Truro
English cricketers
Hertfordshire cricketers